James Livingston may refer to:

James Livingston (bishop) (died 1483), Bishop of Dunkeld
James Livingston, 1st Earl of Callendar (c. 1590s–1674), army officer who fought on the Royalist side in the Wars of the Three Kingdoms
James Livingstone, 1st Viscount Kilsyth (1616–1661), Scottish Royalist, raised to the peerage of Scotland as Viscount Kilsyth and Lord Campsie in 1661
James Livingston (American Revolution) (1747–1832), colonel of the 1st Canadian Regiment
James Livingston (Canadian politician) (1838–1920), member of Canadian House of Commons
James E. Livingston (born 1940), United States Marine Corps Medal of Honor recipient
Jamie Livingston (1956–1997), New York-based photographer, filmmaker and circus performer
James Livingston (ice hockey) (born 1990), hockey player for the Manchester Monarchs of the AHL
James Livingston (soldier) (1840–1915), New Zealand soldier and community leader
James Livingston, 1st Earl of Newburgh (1622–1670), Scottish peer
James Livingston, 1st Lord Livingston (c. 1410–1467), Scottish nobleman
James Livingston, 5th Earl of Linlithgow (died 1723), Scottish nobleman